Petagna is a surname. Notable people with the surname include:

 Andrea Petagna (born 1995), Italian footballer
  (1812–1878), Italian Catholic bishop
 Vincenzo Petagna (1734–1810), Italian biologist and physician, director of the Monte Oliveto botanical gardens
 Andrew Petagna (born 1991), American computer teacher